Huancané Province (from Aymara Wanqani , meaning "the one with big stones") is a province of the Puno Region in Peru. The capital of the province is the city of Huancané.

Geography 
Other mountains are listed below:

Political division 
The province measures  and is divided into eight districts:

Ethnic groups 
The people in the province are mainly indigenous citizens of Aymara and Quechua descent. Aymara is the language which the majority of the population (53.26%) learnt to speak in childhood, 30.82% of the residents started speaking using the Quechua language and  15.70% using Spanish (2007 Peru Census).

See also 
 Awki awki

References 

Provinces of the Puno Region
States and territories established in 1827
1827 establishments in Peru